Daniel Phelan (November 5, 1861 – July 28, 1934) was a Major League Baseball first baseman who played for the Louisville Colonels of the American Association in .

External links

1861 births
1934 deaths
Major League Baseball first basemen
Louisville Colonels players
19th-century baseball players
Waterbury Brass Citys players
New Haven Blues players
Springfield Horsemen players
Auburn Yankees players
Omaha Omahogs players
Omaha Lambs players
Baseball players from Connecticut
Sportspeople from Waterbury, Connecticut